Love, Stargirl is a 2007 young adult novel by Jerry Spinelli.

The book is the sequel to the New York Times bestselling book, Stargirl, and centers on "the world's longest letter" in diary form.  It picks up where the previous novel left off after Stargirl left Mica High and describes her bittersweet memories in the town of Mica, Arizona along with the involvements of new people in her life, in Phoenixville, Pennsylvania.

Plot
New in town, homeschooled, and feeling rejected by Leo, the 16-year-old narrator of the first book who had fallen under her spell, she is lonely and sad—her "happy wagon," where she keeps stones representing her level of happiness, is almost empty. She befriends Dootsie, a noisy but lovable 6-year-old who takes a shine to Stargirl and wants to switch.

Dootsie introduces her to Betty Lou, an agoraphobic elderly woman. She is quite nice and Stargirl soon becomes friends with her as well. They also share a very nice time watching flowers together. 

With the arrival of autumn, Stargirl's life is affected as she meets several new characters:  Alvina, a grumpy young girl who delivers donuts to Betty Lou; Perry, a teen boy who Alvina is falling in love with; and Perry's "harem," The Honeybees.

As winter sets in, Stargirl plans a Winter Solstice party, inviting all of the people she has encountered in her new town to celebrate the beginning of winter by joining her at sunrise on her Enchanted Hill, which she now calls Calendar Hill. Stargirl also discovers the truth about Perry, who has been very mysterious about his family and personal life. She learns his mother has a new baby, whom Perry has been trying to support by working several jobs and by resorting to "stealing" to avoid burdening her with feeding him. In the end, Stargirl becomes worried that no one will show up for her solstice party, but is reassured by Archie, her former teacher and friend from Arizona, who arrives to attend her celebration and comforts her with his wisdom.

On the morning of the Winter Solstice, Stargirl is overwhelmed and surprised when a huge crowd of her friends and acquaintances, and several other people she's unfamiliar with, flock to Calendar Hill, including her friend Betty Lou who hasn't left her house in nine years. The magic moment of sunrise is magnified by a special tent her parents have built, allowing the sunlight to stream in through a hole in the tent, forming a single beam that cuts through the crowd of people and pierces the back wall. Everyone is profoundly affected by the start of this new day and returns home to the start of a cold winter.

In the end, Stargirl asks Archie what she should do about missing Leo, and about Perry. He tells her to remember who she is and do what her heart tells her.

Characters

 Susan Julia "Stargirl" Caraway is a unique teenager that has no boundaries when it comes to clothing or acts of kindness. She would go to the ends of the earth to achieve happiness, not for herself, but others. She has many quirky acts that she not-so-subtly pulls off throughout the book, like dropping pennies on the sidewalk, starting a gardening business, meditating, befriending little girls, and going on milk runs with her father, a milkman. Her best friend is Dootsie, a spunky six-year-old that also has no boundaries... for anything. Her love interest is Perry Delloplane, though he sends her mixed messages, going so far as to invite her to join his harem. However, throughout the book she struggles with her feelings, trying to understand how she's feeling and whether her heart belongs to Leo or Perry.
 Leo Borlock is Stargirl's former love interest from Mica, Arizona. During the time of this novel, she is writing the world's longest letter to Leo, documenting her days and adventures with her new friends and difficulties in her new town. Leo broke Stargirl's heart, but she still loves him, only finalizing her choice between Leo and Perry when she shares a kiss with Perry at Calendar Hill, but says later she didn't think they were right for each other. Leo is mentioned many times in the book.
 Dootsie Pringle is a spunky six-year-old that is quick to befriend Stargirl after discovering her meditating on a table. Dootsie is outgoing and chats to anyone that comes her way. She is attention seeking, often running away, or pretending to be invisible, thinking it will attract attention, seeing as everyone pretends they can't see her. She also befriends Betty Lou Fern, an older agoraphobic neighbor of hers, mostly because of Betty Lou gifts Dootsie with yummy homemade treats and donuts.
 Perry Delloplane is a juvenile boy about Stargirl's age. He is seen to be a delinquent, telling people he went to boot camp for a year, when he was actually staying with his aunt. His mother is pregnant, and when his little sister is born, he shows a surprisingly caring, gentle side, and is extremely protective. He has an affection for Stargirl. He likes to joke around with her, and she as well is quite smitten with him, even joining his harem.
 The Honeybees are Perry's harem, a club of open admirers who all fancy him. He feels no shame in kissing them in public, often in front of other harem members, who don't mind, and going on dates with them, but never seriously. He is always just acting like the one girl he's kissing or sitting with is the only girl in the world and no other girl matters to him yet he still glances and has a feelings for Stargirl. 
 Betty Lou Fern is the agoraphobic middle-aged neighbor of Stargirl and Dootsie. She never leaves her house, and Stargirl and Dootsie come to visit her almost every day. Betty Lou gifts them with delicious treats, like Margie's donuts. Betty Lou has a soft spot for mockingbirds and flowers but was forced to give up their beauty after her fear becomes worse. Betty Lou always has great advice for Stargirl on her romance indecision, and almost stands in place for Archie. She had a husband, whom she nicknamed "Mr. Potato Nose"
 Alvina Klecko is a very unsociable tween going through a transformation between her tomboyish ways and her dolls. She tends to have a very confrontational demeanor, often pretending to ignore Stargirl's preachings, but listens and almost always heeds them in the end. She delivers Betty Lou's Donuts, even after she was fired from Margie's. Alvina is also shown to have a little crush on Perry Delloplane, and a blond boy from her school.
 Margie is the owner of a doughnut shop in the town Stargirl moves to. Her donuts are famous in town. She is most famous for her crazy doughnut inventions, like donut pie and donut soup. She is also very talkative, chatting to anyone that comes through the door, taking a particular liking to Stargirl.
 Charlie is an old man who sits in the cemetery every day by his wife's grave, supposedly listening and talking to her. Stargirl first approached him by leaving donuts for him, which took a few tries, then eventually brought Dootsie along with her. This action made them friends, and Dootsie and Stargirl often go down to visit them, Stargirl mostly questioning about Grace, his deceased wife and himself.
 The Huffelmeyers are an old couple that Stargirl's father delivers milk to. She recognizes them for their old-fashioned ways.
 Cinnamon is Stargirl's pet rat. He is lost after Stargirl puts him in a mailbox during a fire, however, Arnold later finds him and later returns him to Stargirl.
 Arnold is known to constantly wander around asking, "Are you looking for me?" After returning Cinnamon, he gets a pet rat of his own.

External links

Publisher's website - Randomhouse
Publisher's news on the book
Author's website: Jerry Spinelli
Book review

References

2007 American novels
American young adult novels
Novels by Jerry Spinelli
Epistolary novels
Novels set in Pennsylvania
Chester County, Pennsylvania
Sequel novels